LK or lk may refer to:

Businesses and organizations
 Air Luxor, IATA airline code
 Marking of Latin Kings (gang)
 Luckin Coffee, Chinese coffee house chain (former NASDAQ ticker lk)

Science and technology
 System LK, in mathematics, the classical sequent calculus
 LK (spacecraft), a Soviet lunar lander

Other uses
 LK (index mark code), county Limerick, Ireland, vehicle registration
 LK I, a German light tank prototype of the World War I
 LK II, a German light tank of World War I
 LK-700, a Soviet direct ascent lunar lander program proposed in 1964
 The LK, a Swedish indie band
 Sri Lanka (ISO 3166-1 alpha-2 country code LK)
 .lk, Internet top-level domain for Sri Lanka
 En-LK, Sri Lankan English

See also

 
 KL (disambiguation)
 IK (disambiguation)
 1K (disambiguation)
 L (disambiguation)
 K (disambiguation)